Bonshaw is a locality on the southern rural fringe of the City of Ballarat in Victoria, Australia.

Bonshaw was named for a sheep run which John Winter purchased from George Russell and Henry Anderson, who was part of the party which first sighted the future area of Ballarat, in the 1840s. Although Anderson named it Waverley Park, Winter renamed it Bonshaw after the estate of his father-in-law. In 2012, the city council named a watercourse in Bonshaw and Delacombe Banyule Creek. In mid-2022, an application for another housing development in Bonshaw was submitted to the council. On 1 November 2023, parts of Bonshaw was incorporated into the Wendouree district. The companies Jellis Craig and Florian Living are currently developing their own real estate projects in Bonshaw.

References

Suburbs of Ballarat